Goskomtsen was the State Committee on Prices in the former Soviet Union. This governmental body regulated all prices, from agricultural to consumer goods and established prices for all imports and some exports.

State Committees of the Soviet Union
Economy of the Soviet Union
Prices, State Committee on
1991 disestablishments in the Soviet Union